Kowkur is a village in Malkajgiri mandal, Medchal district in Telangana, India. Mastan Baba dargah is located in this area.

It is fast developing into a major residential area. It is beside the Secunderabad Cantonment area.

The very mystical famous Sufi Islamic shrine of Mastan Baba dargah is located in this area.

References

Villages in Ranga Reddy district